Benjamin Morton Friedman (born 1944) is an American political economist, who is the William Joseph Maier Professor of Political Economy at Harvard University. He is a member of the Council on Foreign Relations, the Brookings Institute's Panel on Economic Activity, and the editorial board of the Encyclopædia Britannica. He is a recipient of the John R. Commons Award, given by the economics honor society Omicron Delta Epsilon.

Biography
Friedman received his A.B., A.M., and Ph.D. degrees, all in economics, from Harvard University.  He also received an M.Sc. in economics and politics from King's College, Cambridge as a Marshall Scholar.  He has been on the Harvard faculty since 1972.  Currently Friedman is a member of the Committee on Capital Markets Regulation.

Partial bibliography
 Economic Stabilization Policy: Methods in Optimization,  American Elsevier (1975)
 Monetary Policy in the United States: Design and Implementation, Association of Reserve City Bankers (1981)
 Day of Reckoning: The Consequences of American Economic Policy under Reagan and After, Random House (1988)
 Implications of Increasing Corporate Indebtedness for Monetary Policy, Group of Thirty (New York, NY) (1990)
 Does Debt Management Matter?, with Jonas Agell and Mats Persson, Oxford University Press (New York, NY) (1992)
 The Moral Consequences of Economic Growth, Knopf (2005)
 Religion and the Rise of Capitalism, Knopf (2021)

Notes

References
 Encyclopædia Britannica - about the editorial board
 "Benjamin M. Friedman" in Contemporary Authors Online, Thomson Gale, entry updated 9/17/2002.

External links
 Benjamin Friedman, homepage at Harvard
 Other works Amazon.com
 Brad DeLong's Semi-Daily Journal book review (27-Dec-2005)
 Growth is Good: An economist's take on the moral consequences of material progress; by J. Bradford DeLong

1944 births
Living people
People from Kentucky
Futurologists
20th-century American economists
21st-century American economists
20th-century American Jews
Marshall Scholars
Harvard University faculty
Harvard College alumni
Alumni of King's College, Cambridge
Fellows of the American Academy of Arts and Sciences
21st-century American Jews
University of Illinois College of Liberal Arts and Sciences alumni